The Lao Theung or Lao Thoeng (Lao: ລາວເທິງ ) is one of the traditional divisions of ethnic groups living in Laos (the others being the Lao Loum and the Lao Soung). It literally indicates the "midland Lao", and comprises a variety of different ethnic groups of mostly Austro-Asiatic origin.  In 1993, the Lao Theung formed 24% of the country's population.

History
Lao Theung are largely of Mon-Khmer stock, and are believed to be the autochthonous population of mainland Southeast Asia, having migrated south in pre-historical time. Their legendary origin is related in the "Pumpkin Story" in James McCarthy's account of 1894.  Although they now live in the higher uplands of Laos, they were originally paddy rice farmers, until displaced by the influx of Lao Loum migration into southeast Asia from Southern China. See upland rice farmers' challenges.

Culture
Within Laos, the Lao Theung are sometimes referred to by the pejorative term khaa (Lao: ຂ້າ), meaning "slave", reflecting the fact that they were traditionally used for labour by the lowland Lao. Midland Lao still have a lower standard of living than other ethnic groups.

See also 
Degar
Khmer Loeu
Ban Phou Pheung Noi

References

External links
 Laos ethnic diversity, at country-studies.com

Ethnic groups in Laos